Sándor Gujdár (born 8 November 1951) is a Hungarian former footballer who played as a goalkeeper. He played for Szegedi EOL, Honvéd, Aris Thesaloniki, and the Hungary national football team - where he earned 25 caps - including two appearances at the 1978 FIFA World Cup Finals in Argentina. He became Hungarian champions with Honvéd in 1980. One year after he moved to Greece to play for Aris Thessaloniki, his professional career was cut short by a serious head injury. He resumed playing in 1986, and spent three years in Austria with lower-class Oxtbahn XI. He later worked as a coach.

Notes

Sources

Gujdár volt a legjobb barát 
Mit mondjunk, bejött! – Korábbi magyar válogatott játékosok Maradona ma harmincéves bemutatkozásáról 
A negyedik helyezett: Gujdár Sándor 
olympiacos-sa.eoldal.hu: Gujdár Sándor 
stop.hu: Mi van Gujdár Sándorral?
 Ki kicsoda a magyar sportéletben?, I. kötet (A–H). Szekszárd, Babits Kiadó, 1994, 405. o.,  
 Rejtő László–Lukács László–Szepesi György: Felejthetetlen 90 percek (Sportkiadó, 1977)

References

1951 births
Living people
Hungarian footballers
Hungarian expatriate footballers
Hungary international footballers
1978 FIFA World Cup players
Association football goalkeepers
Budapest Honvéd FC players
Aris Thessaloniki F.C. players
Super League Greece players
Expatriate footballers in Greece